Revelle Inlet is a broad, ice-filled inlet which recedes west some 15 nautical miles (28 km) between Cape Agassiz and Cape Keeler, along the east coast of Palmer Land. The inlet lies in the area explored from the air by Sir Hubert Wilkins in 1928 and Lincoln Ellsworth in 1935, but it was first charted by the United States Antarctic Service (USAS) in 1940. It was resighted by the Ronne Antarctic Research Expedition (RARE), 1947–48, under Ronne, who named it for Roger Revelle, oceanographer at the Scripps Institution of Oceanography, who gave technical assistance during the fitting out of the Ronne expedition.
 

Inlets of Palmer Land